The 2002 NCAA Women's Water Polo Championship was the second annual tournament to determine the national championship of NCAA women's collegiate water polo. The single elimination tournament was played at the McDonald's Olympic Swim Stadium in Los Angeles, California from May 11–12, 2002.

Stanford, in a rematch of the previous year's final, defeated UCLA in the final, 8–4, to win their first NCAA championship. The Cardinal (23–2) were coached by John Tanner.

The leading scorer for the tournament was Brenda Villa, from Stanford, with 5 goals. Stanford's Jackie Frank was named the tournament's Most Outstanding Player.

First and second All Tournament Teams were also named, each consisting of seven players.

Qualification
Since there has only ever been one single national championship for women's water polo, all NCAA women's water polo programs (whether from Division I, Division II, or Division III) were eligible. A total of 4 teams were invited to contest this championship.

Tournament bracket
Site: McDonald's Olympic Swim Stadium, Los Angeles, California

All tournament teams

First Team
Jackie Frank, Stanford (Most Outstanding Player)
Kelly Heuchan, UCLA
Ellen Estes, Stanford
Robin Beauregard, UCLA
Brenda Villa, Stanford
Lucy Windes, Loyola Marymount
Natalie Golda, UCLA
Amber Stachowski, UCLA

Second Team
Betsey Armstrong, Michigan
Thalia Munro, UCLA
Julie Gardner, Stanford
Teresa Guidi, Loyola Marymount
Wendy Watkins, Stanford
Jamie Hipp, UCLA
Jen Crisman, Michigan
Margie Dingeldein, Stanford

See also 
Pre-NCAA Intercollegiate Women's Water Polo Champions (pre-2001)
 NCAA Men's Water Polo Championship

References

2002 in American sports
2002 in water polo
2002 in sports in California
May 2002 sports events in the United States
2002